NWOBHM is an EP by Norwegian black metal band Darkthrone, released during summer 2007 as a "small taster" for their then-upcoming album F.O.A.D.. NWOBHM is usually referred to as new wave of British heavy metal, but, in this case, NWOBHM means "New Wave of Black Heavy Metal".

There are four tracks on the CD version, and only two on the 7" vinyl version. The tracks include a different recording of the song "Wisdom of the Dead" and different vocal version of "Canadian Metal", plus a cover of "Bad Attitude" by the punk rock band Testors (previously issued on Darkthrone's "Forebyggende Krig" single).

Track listing

7" track listing
"Hedninger Fra Helvete"
"Canadian Metal"

Darkthrone albums
2007 EPs